Double Eleven or Double 11 may refer to:

November 11
Singles' Day or Double 11, Chinese shopping holiday
Double Eleven (company), British game developer